The 2020 African U-20 Women's World Cup Qualifying Tournament was the 10th edition of the African U-20 Women's World Cup Qualifying Tournament, the biennial international youth football competition organised by the Confederation of African Football (CAF) to determine which women's under-20 national teams from Africa qualify for the FIFA U-20 Women's World Cup. Players born on or after 1 January 2000 were eligible to compete in the tournament.

Two teams would have qualified from this tournament for the 2021 FIFA U-20 Women's World Cup (originally 2020 but postponed due to COVID-19 pandemic) in Costa Rica as the CAF representatives. However, FIFA announced on 17 November 2020 that this edition of the World Cup would be cancelled. As a result, all remaining qualifying matches were cancelled.

Draw
A total of 29 (out of 54) CAF member national teams entered the qualifying rounds. The draw was held on 4 December 2019 at the CAF headquarters in Cairo, Egypt. The draw procedures were as follows:
In the preliminary round, the 26 teams were drawn into 13 ties, with teams divided into five pots based on their geographical zones and those in the same pot drawn to play against each other.
In the first round, the 13 preliminary round winners and the three teams receiving byes to the first round were allocated into eight ties based on the preliminary round tie numbers, with three preliminary round winners playing against the three teams receiving byes, and the other ten preliminary round winners playing against each other.
In the second round, the eight first round winners were allocated into four ties based on the first round tie numbers.
In the third round, the four second round winners were allocated into two ties based on the second round tie numbers.

Notes
Teams in bold qualified for the World Cup.
(W): Withdrew after draw

Did not enter

Format
Qualification ties were played on a home-and-away two-legged basis. If the aggregate score was tied after the second leg, the away goals rule was applied, and if still tied, the penalty shoot-out (no extra time) was used to determine the winner.

Schedule
The schedule of the qualifying rounds was as follows.

Due to the COVID-19 pandemic, all first round matches, originally scheduled for 20–22 and 27–29 March 2020, had been postponed until further notice. The CAF announced the new dates in July 2020. However, on 15 August 2020, CAF announced that all first round matches, rescheduled for 3–5 and 10–12 September 2020, were again postponed due to travel restrictions across parts of Africa as a result of COVID-19. The CAF sent a letter to the member associations on 21 December 2020 confirming the cancellation of the qualifiers.

Bracket
The two winners of the third round would have qualified for the 2021 FIFA U-20 Women's World Cup.

Preliminary round

|}

Morocco won 8–4 on aggregate.

Algeria won 9–0 on aggregate.

Gabon won on walkover after DR Congo did not appear for the first leg.

Congo won 6–2 on aggregate.

Liberia won 7–5 on aggregate.

Burkina Faso won 3–2 on aggregate.

Guinea-Bissau won 15–0 on aggregate.

Senegal won 1–0 on aggregate.

Tanzania won 4–2 on aggregate.

Ethiopia won 7–1 on aggregate.

Zimbabwe won 2–1 on aggregate.

Botswana won 9–0 on aggregate.

South Africa won 4–2 on aggregate.

First round

|}

Second round

|}

Third round
Winners would have qualified for the 2021 FIFA U-20 Women's World Cup.

|}

Goalscorers

Notes

References

2020
Women's U-20 World Cup Qualifying Tournament
African U-20 World Cup Qualifying Tournament
African U-20 Women's World Cup Qualifying Tournament
2020 FIFA U-20 Women's World Cup qualification
January 2020 sports events in Africa
February 2020 sports events in Africa
Association football events curtailed and voided due to the COVID-19 pandemic